Martin Walters (born 12 March 1985) is a South African cricketer. He made his first-class debut for Western Province in the 2005–06 SAA Provincial Challenge on 13 October 2005.

References

External links
 

1985 births
Living people
South African cricketers
Border cricketers
Western Province cricketers
Cricketers from East London, Eastern Cape